Marie Jenny Emilie Aubry (née Weiss; 8 October 1903 – 21 January 1987) was a French psychiatrist and psychoanalyst.

Life and career
Born in to the Parisian middle-class elite, to Paul Louis Weiss (1867-1945) and Jeanne Félicie Weiss (née Javal; 1871-1956), the daughter of Louis Émile Javal. She was the sister of the famous suffragette Louise Weiss. Aubry was among the first female doctors to qualify in France. Having worked with the Resistance during the war, she discovered psychoanalysis through Anna Freud in 1948, and trained as a psychoanalyst under the supervision of Jacques Lacan, with whom she developed a friendship and whom she followed through the various splits of the French psychoanalytic movement.

Aware too of the work of such figures as René Spitz and John Bowlby, Aubry began to specialise in the treatment of institutionalised children, exploring the role of maternal deprivation in their symptomatology. Her book Enfance Abandonée was published in 1953, and her collected papers in 2003.

Family
Jenny Aubry was the mother of Élisabeth Roudinesco. Through her mother she was the niece of Alice Anna Weiller (née Javal) and the cousin of Paul-Louis Weiller, the son of Alice and Lazare Weiller.

See also

Publications
*

References

1903 births
1987 deaths
French psychiatrists
French psychoanalysts
Place of birth missing
20th-century French physicians
French women psychiatrists
20th-century women physicians
20th-century French women